The Bob Rogers House was a historic house at South Spring Street and West Woodruff Avenue in Searcy, Arkansas.  It was a two-story wood frame I-house, with a gabled roof, weatherboard siding, and a brick foundation.  Its most prominent feature was a projecting pedimented Greek Revival portico.  It was built about 1870, and was one of the city's few examples of Greek Revival architecture.

The house was listed on the National Register of Historic Places in 1991.  It has been listed as destroyed in the Arkansas Historic Preservation Program database, and was delisted in 2018.

See also
National Register of Historic Places listings in White County, Arkansas

References

Houses on the National Register of Historic Places in Arkansas
Greek Revival architecture in Arkansas
Houses completed in 1870
Houses in Searcy, Arkansas
Demolished buildings and structures in Arkansas
National Register of Historic Places in Searcy, Arkansas
Former National Register of Historic Places in Arkansas
1870 establishments in Arkansas
I-houses in Arkansas